Michael Gottesman may refer to:

 Michael Gottesman (lawyer), lawyer and law professor
 Michael M. Gottesman (born 1946), scientist